Poimenesperus is a genus of longhorn beetles of the subfamily Lamiinae, containing the following species:

subgenus Nyctesperus
 Poimenesperus niveicollis Aurivillius, 1903

subgenus Poimenesperus
 Poimenesperus albomaculatus Breuning, 1934
 Poimenesperus callimus Jordan, 1903
 Poimenesperus carreti Lisle, 1955
 Poimenesperus dobraei (Waterhouse, 1881)
 Poimenesperus fulvomarmoratus Jordan, 1894
 Poimenesperus gillieri Villiers, 1959
 Poimenesperus griseomarmoratus Breuning, 1934
 Poimenesperus holdhausi Breuning, 1934
 Poimenesperus imitans Breuning, 1934
 Poimenesperus incubus Thomson, 1858
 Poimenesperus laetus Thomson, 1858
 Poimenesperus ligatus Jordan, 1894
 Poimenesperus lugens (White, 1858)
 Poimenesperus marmoratus Jordan, 1894
 Poimenesperus nigrosignatus Breuning, 1947
 Poimenesperus nigrovelutinus Breuning, 1938
 Poimenesperus obliquus Aurivillius, 1916
 Poimenesperus ochraceus Breuning, 1934
 Poimenesperus phrynetoides Jordan, 1894
 Poimenesperus schoutedeni Breuning, 1934
 Poimenesperus tessmanni Hintz, 1919
 Poimenesperus thomsoni (Pascoe, 1869)
 Poimenesperus velutinus (White, 1858)
 Poimenesperus villiersi Lepesme, 1947
 Poimenesperus voluptuosus Thomson, 1857
 Poimenesperus zebra Fiedler, 1939

References

 
Tragocephalini
Cerambycidae genera